Bouaké (or Bwake, N’ko: ߓߐ߰ߞߍ߫ Bɔ̀ɔkɛ́) is the second-largest city in Ivory Coast, with a population of 740,000 (2021 census). It is the seat of three levels of subdivision—Vallée du Bandama District, Gbêkê Region, and Bouaké Department.

Name 
For the name of the city Bouaké, there are two possible origins:

 The corruption of the chief name Kwa Gbéké that made the foundations of the city of Bouaké.
 The name Bouaké coming from two Baoulé words: "Boua" which means sheep and "Ké" which means dry. Thus meaning the place in which sheep are dried as they would have seen Jola drying sheep skins when they arrived in Bouaké.

Demographics

History 
In the 1800s a group related to the Akan, the Assabou and Baoulé settled in the vicinity of where Bouaké was, initially the village was named Gbèkèkro, so named after the leader of the Baoulé, Gossan Kwa Gbeke and kro meaning town or settlement of.

Bouaké was established as a French military post in 1899 and has been an administrative center since 1914.

French and United Nations peacekeepers currently reside in the city as part of an enforced ceasefire between the rebel-held north and the government-held south.  After the attempt to overthrow the president Laurent Gbagbo had failed, the rebel forces FN (forces nouvelles) led by Guillaume Soro made Bouaké their center of control.  Subsequently, Bouaké University, opened in 1996, was closed down in September 2002.  Financed by Unesco, the university reopened in April, 2005.

On 4 November 2004, governmental forces used Sukhoi-25s to raid the city as an opening movement towards "territorial liberation", according to Captain Jean-Noël Abbey of the Côte d'Ivoire army.
In 2014, the population of the sub-prefecture of Bouaké-SP was 71,949.

Climate 
Köppen-Geiger climate classification system classifies Bouaké's climate as tropical wet and dry (Aw). The city features a lengthy wet season spanning the months of March through October, and a shorter harmattan-influenced dry season that covers the remaining 4 months. Despite the lengthy wet season, Bouaké does not see the level of rainfall experienced in Abidjan.

Economy 

Tobacco products, building materials, and textiles are produced, and cotton sisal and rice are processed. Gold, mercury, and manganese are found nearby.  The overall economy was shaken during the near decade long rebel rule that started in 2002.  Many companies either shut down or relocated to Abidjan, Ivory Coast's coastal economic hub.  These events resulted in the 60% reduction in formal employment.  For example, the city's biggest textile mill, the Gonfreville Establishment, saw an employment decrease of 1200 workers, an 80% reduction. Economic recovery was slow until the early 2010s.  After the State took back control of Bouake after the 2010-2011 election, the economy moved into a state of reconstruction.  Roads were repaved after years of neglect, which allowed the transportation of goods to become an easier task.  Cash crops such as cotton and cashews started to be transported in higher quantities to be processed in Bouake.  Singapore-based Olam opened a cashew processing plant in Bouake in 2012, which accounts for nearly 2400 jobs.  The agribusiness as a whole is beginning to turn to its original state before the rebel conflict.  Additionally, banks have opened new branches and supermarkets have returned to normal operation.  The government is stimulating this regrowth through policies, such as price floors, and projects to increase trade, including the construction of a highway to connect Bouake to the nation's capital, Yamoussoukro.

Transports 
The city has the Bouaké Airport located north-west of the city with a  runway.

Located on the line of the railway which connects Abidjan to Ouagadougou in Burkina Faso, the city has the Railway Station Bouaké operated by Sitarail.

The roads that connect Bouaké are the A3 and the A8 going clockwise from the north the A3 connects Katiola and with Korhogo on the A12 eastwards with further destinations in Burkina Faso and Mali. Eastwards the A10 starts in Bouaké and connects to Ghana and to Bondoukou via the A1 northwards and Abengourou southwards. The A8 connects to Abengourou northwards on the A1 and Abidjan southwards. A3 Southbound connects to the political capital Yamoussoukro and the economic capital Abidjan. A8 westbound goes to Beoumi and Lake Kossou continuing to Man and Danané with further destinations in Liberia and Guinea.

Education 
The Université Alassane Ouattara was founded in 1992.

Places of worship    
The most common places of worship are Muslim mosques. There are also Christian churches and temples : Roman Catholic Archdiocese of Bouaké (Catholic Church), United Methodist Church Ivory Coast (World Methodist Council), Union of Missionary Baptist Churches in Ivory Coast (Baptist World Alliance), Assemblies of God.

Administration

Subdivisions
The city itself is a sub-prefectures of Bouaké Department; the surrounding suburbs that are outside of the city limits are also organised into a sub-prefecture known as "Bouaké-SP". Bouaké is also a commune.

The subdivision of the city is as follows

North East:- Dougouba, Liberté, Kodiakoffikro, Attienkro, Dar-es-salam 2 and 3, Camp Militaire, Belleville 1 and 2, Sokoura, IDESSA, Kanakro

North West:- Koko, Lycée Municipal, Zone industrielle, Tièrèkro, Gonfreville, Niankoukro, Aéroport, Konankankro, Allokokro, Mamianou, Kamounoukro, Dar-es-salam 1, Tolla Kouadiokro, Beaufort

South East:- Nimbo, Air France 1 2 and 3, N'Gouatanoukro, Kennedy

South West:- N'Gattakro, Ahougnanssou, Broukro 1 and 2, Houphouët-ville, N'Dakro

Center:- Commerce

Sport 
The local stadium of Bouaké is the Stade Bouaké also known as the Stadium of Peace, it was constructed in 1984 for the 1984 Africa Cup of Nations, it will be one of the host stadiums for the 2023 Africa Cup of Nations and renovation on the stadium started in 2020 in preparation for the event. The stadium capacity before renovation was 35,000, this will increase to 40,000 for the event

The local team is called Bouaké FC and plays in the Stade Bouaké

People that have represented the Ivorian national football team that were born in Bouaké are the Brothers Kolo Touré and Yaya Toure, Abdul Razak (footballer) and Lassina Diabaté

International relations

Twin towns – Sister cities
Bouaké is twinned with:
 Mopti, Mali
 Brescia, Italy
 Beersheba, Israel
 Villeneuve-sur-Lot, France
 Reutlingen, Germany
 Zimnicea, Romania

Villages
The 130 villages of the sub-prefecture of Bouaké-SP and their population in 2014 are:

References

External links 

 Bouaké Travel Guide from World66

 
Sub-prefectures of Gbêkê
District capitals of Ivory Coast
Communes of Gbêkê
Regional capitals of Ivory Coast
Ivory Coast geography articles needing translation from French Wikipedia